Syntactic pattern recognition or structural pattern recognition is a form of pattern recognition, in which each object can be represented by a variable-cardinality set of symbolic, nominal features. This allows for representing pattern structures, taking into account more complex interrelationships between attributes than is possible in the case of flat, numerical feature vectors of fixed dimensionality, that are used in statistical classification.

Syntactic pattern recognition can be used instead of statistical pattern recognition if there is clear structure in the patterns. One way to present such structure is by means of a strings of symbols from a formal language. In this case the differences in the structures of the classes are encoded as different grammars.

An example of this would be diagnosis of the heart with ECG measurements. ECG waveforms can be approximated with diagonal and vertical line segments. If normal and unhealthy waveforms can be described as formal grammars, measured ECG signal can be classified as healthy or unhealthy by first describing it in term of the basic line segments and then trying to parse the descriptions according to the grammars. Another example is tessellation of tiling patterns.

A second way to represent relations are graphs, where nodes are connected if corresponding subpatterns are related. An item can be labeled as belonging to a class if its graph representation is isomorphic with prototype graphs of the class.

Typically, patterns are constructed from simpler sub patterns in a hierarchical fashion. This helps in dividing the recognition task into easier subtask of first identifying sub patterns and only then the actual patterns.

Structural methods provide descriptions of items, which may be useful in their own right. For example, syntactic pattern recognition can be used to find out what objects are present in an image. Furthermore, structural methods are strong in finding a correspondence mapping between two images of an object. Under natural conditions, corresponding features will be in different positions and/or may be occluded in the two images, due to camera-attitude and perspective, as in face recognition. A graph matching algorithm will yield the optimal correspondence.

See also
 Grammar induction
 String matching
 Hopcroft–Karp algorithm
 Structural information theory

References 

Classification algorithms